Nickel Plate Road 765 is a class "S-2" 2-8-4 "Berkshire" type steam locomotive built for the New York, Chicago & St. Louis Railroad, commonly referred to as the "Nickel Plate Road". In 1963, No. 765, renumbered as 767, was donated to the city of Fort Wayne, Indiana, where it sat on display at the Lawton Park, while the real No. 767 was scrapped in Chicago in 1964. In the early 1970s, the newly formed Fort Wayne Railroad Historical Society (FWRHS) restored No. 765 and operate it in main line excursion service to this day. It was added to the National Register of Historic Places on September 12, 1996. Since 2010, the No. 765 locomotive visited the Cuyahoga Valley Scenic Railroad, hauling several train excursions every year.

History

Background (1925–1944)
At the turn of the 20th century, railroads faced a surmounting problem: an increase in traffic and limited steam technology. Railroads commonly relied on drag freights with engines that could pull heavy tonnage but at low speeds. Following experiments with existing designs, Lima Locomotive Works developed a new wheel arrangement to accommodate an increase in the size of the locomotive's firebox. An increase in the firebox size allowed more coal combustion and subsequent heat output, improving the amount of steam developed and increasing horsepower. These and other modifications created the concept of "horsepower at speed" or "Super-power" in Lima's parlance.

In 1925, this "Super-power" technology was successfully realized in a prototype designated the A-1, which was tested in the Berkshire Mountains of the Boston & Albany Railroad, hence the common name of the locomotive type. The 2-8-4 design was quickly adopted by the New York Central, Erie Railroad, Illinois Central, Pere Marquette, Boston & Maine, Chesapeake & Ohio and the Nickel Plate Road.

The Nickel Plate Road was able to eventually employ 80 Berkshires on high-speed freight and passenger trains with the first order (designated S Class) 15 were supplied by the American Locomotive Works (ALCO) in 1934 based on Lima's design. Eight years later, Lima began producing three more sub-classes, which differed from the S class in little more than weight. Class S-1 (715–739) in 1942, class S-2 (740–769) in 1944 and class S-3 (770–779) in 1949. As a group, these engines were referred to as the "Seven Hundreds."

An additional number of Berkshires (S-4 class) were acquired when the Nickel Plate Road leased the Wheeling and Lake Erie Railroad in 1949. As a direct result of the Berkshire class, the railroad earned a reputation for high-speed service, which later became its motto.

No. 765's construction was completed on September 8, 1944.

Revenue service (1944–1958)
No. 765 was first assigned to Bellevue, Ohio, where it was used primarily on the Nickel Plate's fast freight trains. After World War II, the locomotive worked primarily out of a classification yard in the east side of Fort Wayne, Indiana.

Its final revenue run came on June 14, 1958 when No. 765 was activated to supply steam heat to a stranded passenger train. That December, it became the last Nickel Plate Road Berkshire under steam.

As evidence of their reputation, Fort Wayne's The News-Sentinel remarked in a June 7 article that "the Nickel Plate's massive Berkshires – steam engines that look like an engine should – have always been the special pets of Fort Wayne and area rail buffs. But not for long. The famed Berkshires carved an enviable record in railroad history and were the most colorful engines in this part of the country. On the Nickel Plate they were just as economical as diesel power, but the Berkshires are giving up in the inevitable face of progress."

Retirement (1958–1963)
Though the Berkshires had competed with encroaching diesel-electric technology, they were largely retired by 1958 and kept in "stored serviceable" condition by the railroad. Traffic reduction and the acquisition of new diesel locomotives would keep the locomotives mothballed, stored outdoors, and scrapped by 1964.

Due to its mechanical condition and favorable reputation among local crews, Nickel Plate maintained the 765 indoors until 1961. In a move to honor the success of Fort Wayne's "Elevate the Nickel Plate" project, the city requested S-2 No. 767 for display in Lawton Park in recognition of it being the first ceremonial train to open the overpass. Following a 1950s wreck and storage outdoors after 1957, no. 767 proved to be in deteriorated condition.

After switching the numbers, the railroad donated the locomotive to the city on May 4, 1963 for display at 4th and Clinton Streets. A plaque commemorating the occasion read: "Nickel Plate Road Berkshire No. 767, used to break ribbon at dedication of track elevation on October 4th, 1955, donated by the New York, Chicago, and St. Louis Railroad company to the City of Fort Wayne as a monument to a great period in the development of our country – the era of steam railroading."

Restoration (1971–1980)
In September 1971 at the annual convention of the Nickel Plate Historical & Technical Society, Wayne York, Glenn Brendel and Walter Sassmannshausen, Jr. met to discuss forming a group to cosmetically restore former Nickel no. 765/767 and Wabash no. 534, another locomotive that had been installed for display in Swinney Park in 1957.

By November 1972, York, Brendel, Sassmannshausen, and John Eichman signed incorporation papers for the Fort Wayne Railroad Historical Society, Inc.

By 1973, FWRHS undertook a 25-year lease of 765/767 and in 1974 moved the engine to New Haven, Indiana to begin what was now a restoration to operation. On October 25, the locomotive was returned to its original number and restoration officially began.

From 1975 to 1979, No. 765 was restored to operating condition at the corner of Ryan and Edgerton Roads in New Haven. The restoration site lacked conventional shop facilities and protection from the elements, but on September 1, 1979, No. 765 made its first move under its own power.

Later that winter it ran under its own power to Bellevue and Sandusky, Ohio for heated, indoor winter storage. In spring of 1980, No. 765 underwent a series of break-in runs and its first public excursion, making No. 765 the first mainline steam locomotive to be restored and operated by an all volunteer non-profit.

First excursion service (1980–1993)

The popularity of restoring and operating steam locomotives on the general railroad system as marketing tools increased with Class 1 and regional railroads in the decades after steam was retired. Before its merger with Norfolk and Western Railway, the Southern Railway, following firebox problems with its former Chesapeake & Ohio 2716, another 2-8-4 steam locomotive, leased the 765 in 1982 for a series of successful trips that would pave the way for Norfolk Southern to continue the steam program with larger, mainline locomotives like 4-8-4 (Northern) Norfolk and Western 611.

In the 1980s, the locomotive appeared in the movies Four Friends and Matewan, and became an annual attraction in the New River Gorge operating the New River Trains from 1985 to 1988 and again from 1990 to 1993. These trips regularly saw the 765 with close to and sometimes over 30 passenger cars traveling a  round-trip during peak fall color season, with passengers from around the world. In 1985, the FWRHS obtained ownership of 765.

In August 1991, 765 was paired with the recently-restored Pere Marquette No. 1225 for the National Railroad Historical Society's convention in Huntington, West Virginia. In 1993, 765 teamed up with 2-8-2 (Mikado) Nickel Plate Road No. 587 between Fort Wayne and Chicago, Illinois. Shortly after, the engine was briefly re-lettered and renumbered to Chesapeake & Ohio No. 2765 (as a C&O Kanawha of her own) in recognition of the heritage of the route on which the New River Trains traveled.

765 successfully operated over several Class 1 railroads in the Midwest and East Coast, including Conrail, CSX and Norfolk Southern; pulled the New River Train a record of 32 times by 1993; and headlined 124 trips over the Norfolk Southern by 1994. 765 was given the title of "veteran excursion engine" by TRAINS Magazine in 1992 and named the reason "why boys still leave home" by Railfan & Railroad Magazine in 1994.

By 1993, the locomotive had accumulated  since its last major overhaul by the Nickel Plate Road,  of which were incurred during its excursion career alone. The locomotive had developed signs of wear and was originally slated for a running-gear overhaul upon completion of the excursion season that year.

Downtime and overhaul (1993–2006)
Between 1993 and 2001, 765 was largely a static exhibit until a complete overhaul was commenced. In the meantime, the FWRHS operated Milwaukee Road 261 and restored C&O 2716, the same locomotive which had developed firebox problems while on the Southern Railway, under lease from the Kentucky Railway Museum. After initial operations in 1996, 2716 required new tubes and flues per newly enacted Federal Railroad Administration regulations. At the time, the railroad historical society decided that it would fully invest its resources into a complete rebuild of 765.

Following a series of grant requests, the FWRHS was awarded an 80% match through the Transportation Equity Act for the 21st Century, which at the time included historic structures. The remaining 20% was raised through donations and contributions, with a large portion of the rebuild work administered by FWRHS volunteers.

Over a period of five years, 765 was completely disassembled, with its boiler, frame and running-gear separated and major components re-machined or rebuilt completely. In July, 2005, the locomotive underwent a successful steam test and was later rolled-out the following October for the general public. Fort Wayne and Allen County Commissioners designated October 28, 2005 as "Engine no. 765 Day" and the locomotive completed a series of test runs on the Chicago, Fort Wayne, and Eastern Railroad in March, 2006.

Overall, the rebuild consumed more than 15,000 hours and cost over $772,000.

Second excursion service (2006–present)
In 2006, the FWRHS was given an "Locomotive Restoration Award" by the Tourist Railway Association, Inc. and the "Outstanding Restoration Award" from the Architecture and Community Heritage Foundation of Fort Wayne.

Despite several attempts, the FWRHS was initially unable to secure a host railroad on which to operate 765, as mounting liability costs and busy, profitable railroads had all but curtailed the majority of mainline steam excursions during the 765's overhaul. Despite these unfavorable logistics, the FWRHS planned and executed 765's first trips in sixteen years at Hoosier Valley Railroad Museum on May 21, 2009.

From 2009 to 2011, No. 765 largely operated passenger excursions, photo charters and public events on regional and short line railroads, including the Chesapeake and Indiana, Great Lakes Central, Cuyahoga Valley Scenic Railroad and Iowa Interstate, the latter of which enabled the 765 to traverse the Mississippi River for the first time.

In 2012, Norfolk Southern leased 765 to operate a series of employee appreciation specials in Ohio, Pennsylvania, West Virginia and Missouri, to mark the company's 30th anniversary. The FWRHS, celebrating its own 40th anniversary, outfitted 765 with a GPS tracker which was viewed over 120,000 times on August 20, 2012, with a mobile app version downloaded over 19,000 times. Of note, the locomotive is the first steam locomotive to maintain an active Twitter presence: a practice later followed by Union Pacific's steam program.

In 2013, 765 was officially included in Norfolk Southern's 21st Century Steam program: an effort to engage the general public and celebrate the railroad's heritage through steam locomotive operations. It operated public trips in Ohio and Pennsylvania in May, 2013. Memorial Day Weekend marked the first public steam-powered excursions over Horseshoe Curve since 1977. In August 2013, the Fort Wayne Railroad Historical Society announced plans to run two  round-trip excursions in mid-October, 2013 between Fort Wayne and Lafayette, Indiana, along a line once owned by the Wabash Railroad (and the route of the "Wabash Canonball"). This was the first time since 1993 that a steam excursion had operated out of Fort Wayne.

The 2015 schedule for 765 consisted of: July 18–19: Fort Wayne, Indiana to Lafayette, Indiana, on the route of the old Wabash Cannonball. On the weekend of July 25–26, the Berkshire hauled excursions from Youngstown, Ohio to Ashtabula, Ohio. On the weekend of August 1–2, it traveled on the former Erie Railroad from Buffalo, New York to Corning, New York; the highlight of the trip was the run over the Portage Viaduct at Letchworth State Park. On the weekend of August 22–23, 765 ran from Allentown, Pennsylvania to Pittston, Pennsylvania. While in Scranton, Pennsylvania in August–September for Steamtown National Historic Site's RailFest 2015, the locomotive was housed in the roundhouse alongside Nickel Plate Road 759.

Between 2016 and 2018, the FWRHS teamed up with Metra, Chicago's commuter rail system, to pull excursions; the 765 pulled excursions between the North Glenview station, on Metra's Milwaukee District / North Line, and Janesville, Wisconsin, with the train being called the Varsity in June 2016. Plans also called for an excursion from Chicago's Union Station to Galesburg, Illinois, in a partnership with Amtrak, as the Galesburg Zephyr: a trip that was eventually canceled due to low ticket sales. At that time in August, No. 765 regained its original mars light. In 2017 and 2018, the 765 pulled the Joliet Rocket over Metra's Rock Island District between Joliet and Chicago, with music and food being provided for passengers at Chicago's LaSalle Street Station, which was, at one point, the Chicago terminus for the Nickel Plate Road. The 765, on these excursions, pulled the train into Chicago, with a Metra locomotive pulling the train back to Joliet, due to no place to turn-around either the train or the 765 alone in a timely manner. 

In 2020, 765 was unable to pull any excursions due to the COVID-19 pandemic and was only steamed up on the weekend of October 2-4th, 2020.

In September 2021, No. 765 returned to the Cuyahoga Valley Scenic once more to pull more excursion trains on their trackage, and during the final days of this visit, the locomotive reunited in Bellevue with another fellow NKP 2-8-4 No. 757, which recently received a cosmetic restoration by the Mad River and NKP Railroad Museum. From July to October 2022, the No. 765 locomotive visited the Indiana Northeastern Railroad, hauling the Indiana Rail Experience excursions on their trackage as part of a multi-year partnership between them and the FWRHS.

Tourism
On average, the locomotive experiences 3,000 visitors a day when operating, with visitor and passenger numbers running between 40,000 and 60,000 ticket buyers in 2009 and 2011 in less than 30 days, respectively. Typical passenger trains carry anywhere from 600 to 1,000 people at a time,  with tickets for many trips selling out in 24 hours.

Press reports indicate the continuous presence of large crowds of "locals and out-of-towners" and on 765's ability to boost tourism in the towns that it travels through. In 2012, the Pittsburgh Tribune's headline photo proclaimed that the 765 was the "engine that still can", and later in 2013 called it a "crowd favorite", with CBS Pittsburgh describing it as "400 tons of Americana."

When not operating excursions, 765 is maintained in a restoration shop in New Haven by a crew of 70–100 volunteers throughout the year. The shop is open to the public and houses a variety of other railroad equipment, including vintage steam and diesel locomotives, passenger cars, cabooses and more.

The operation of the locomotive is underwritten primarily by memberships to the FWRHS, donations and revenue from ticket sales.

In addition to passenger excursion service, 765 is the centerpiece to a proposed riverfront development project called Headwaters Junction, in the locomotive's hometown of Fort Wayne. The plan, endorsed as "big, bold, and transformational" by city leaders and civic groups, calls for the locomotive and FWRHS operations to be based in a mixed-use attraction combining railroad tourism, river access, walking trails and "retail, restaurant, residential, recreational and entertainment businesses." A local task force recommended that Headwaters Junction "not be overlooked...when developing a vision for our riverfront."

References

Further reading

External links

Fort Wayne Railroad Historical Society

765
2-8-4 locomotives
Lima locomotives
Freight locomotives
Individual locomotives of the United States
National Register of Historic Places in Allen County, Indiana
Railway locomotives on the National Register of Historic Places
Rail transportation on the National Register of Historic Places in Indiana
Allen County, Indiana
History of Fort Wayne, Indiana
Tourist attractions in Fort Wayne, Indiana
Standard gauge locomotives of the United States
Preserved steam locomotives of Indiana